The Volkswagen ID. Buzz is a battery electric minivan produced by German manufacturer Volkswagen. Based on the dedicated battery electric MEB platform, it is the first production electric minivan from Volkswagen and part of the Volkswagen ID. series. The design of the ID. Buzz is inspired by the Volkswagen Type 2 (T1) Microbus.

The vehicle was first shown as a concept car at the 2017 North American International Auto Show. The production vehicle was unveiled in March 2022 with production starting in June, and European deliveries in the second half of the year with two models: a five-seater under the name ID. Buzz, and a cargo van as the ID. Buzz Cargo. U.S. availability is slated for 2024 in a long-wheelbase version. This version will also be used for the California campervan variant of the ID. Buzz.

Also a reference to the sound of electricity, the name "Buzz" was derived from the word bus, as the original Volkswagen Type 2/Microbus is commonly known simply as the "Volkswagen Bus".

Overview 

Responding to positive feedback and strong consumer interest for the ID. Buzz Concept shown at Detroit and Geneva in 2017, CEO Herbert Diess announced in August that VW would put the vehicle into production and begin selling it in 2022.

The production version of the ID. Buzz debuted on 9 March 2022. It is one of nine new Volkswagen brand models based on the MEB platform. The ID. Buzz will be available in Europe the second half of 2022, and the US in 2024. Pre-orders in Europe began in May. Series production started in June, with an annual capacity of 130,000 units. The first deliveries are scheduled for fall 2022; the first ID. Buzz off the production line was a Cargo model, delivered to Wolfgang Kempe GmbH in Isernhagen on 15 November 2022.

The ID. Buzz is produced by Volkswagen Commercial Vehicles in Hanover; because prior ID. series vehicles have been built at the Volkswagen Zwickau-Mosel Plant, the Hanover factory needed to be retooled to accommodate EV assembly. Although the Volkswagen Chattanooga Assembly Plant began building the MEB-based ID.4 in 2021 for the US market, Volkswagen Group of America CEO Scott Keogh stated in January 2022 that bringing production of US ID. Buzz models to Chattanooga is unlikely.

In Europe, it will launch in two configurations, a five-seater passenger van, and a cargo van; initially, a short-wheelbase version with rear-wheel drive will be available. A long-wheelbase version will debut in 2023, and will be the only version for sale in the US when it goes on sale in 2024.

Design
According to product lead Jeffrey Lear, the styling of the ID. Buzz was chosen to "be modern and fresh and exciting for folks who may not have even been around [during the 1960s and 70s]" while retaining cues to the original Type 2 (T1)/Microbus, including the prominent front-mounted logo and (optional) two-tone paint. 

The designer of the ID.Buzz is Klaus Zyciora, Head of Volkswagen Group Design.

Dimensions

Interior

Three rows of seating will be made available later; for the SWB model, each row will have two seats for a total capacity of six, while on the long-wheelbase (LWB) model, the middle row will accommodate three for a total capacity of seven.

Seating surfaces use recycled plastics. There is no leather option.

The vehicle's instruments are displayed on a  screen. The vehicle is equipped with up to eight USB ports.

Driving assistance features
Both the ID. Buzz and ID. Buzz Cargo are equipped with the 'Car2X' local warning system to identify hazards in real-time, using signals from transportation infrastructure and other vehicles; in addition, both are equipped with a collision avoidance system (CAS) branded 'Front Assist', which provides automated emergency braking. The passenger version is equipped with 'Lane Assist', which is another CAS designed to keep the vehicle in its travel lane.

Optional assistance features include 'Travel Assist with swarm data', which automates some driving tasks, including lane changes, and 'Memory Function', allowing the vehicle to park itself on a previously saved route.

Versions

Cargo

The ID. Buzz Cargo is based on the short wheelbase version with a minimal number of seats and no rear window. The rear of the vehicle, which is separated from the cab by a bulkhead partition, has  of volume and can carry up to two EUR-pallets. Depending on the configuration, the cab can accommodate two (two individual bucket seats) or three (a double bench and a separate bucket for the driver) people.

It has dual sliding side doors and an option between a liftgate (with a window) or dual wing doors (without windows) for the rear.

Powertrain 

The coefficient of drag is 0.285 for the SWB passenger version and 0.29 for the Cargo.

The vehicle can accept power at a rate of up to 11 kW using an AC source, or 170 kW at a DC fast-charging station; at the latter rate, the 81/77 kW-hr battery will charge from 5% to 80% in 30 minutes. It will be capable of bidirectional V2X supply, supplying power to the electrical grid or a household as needed, although this feature is not expected to be implemented for the US model. A future software update is planned to allow Plug & Charge functionality, where the vehicle will authenticate itself at a compatible DC fast-charging station via the ISO 15118 standard.

Future development

ID. California
In December 2021, Volkswagen confirmed the ID. Buzz would be used as the basis for a future motorhome version, tentatively named ID. California. VW currently market a T6-based campervan in Europe as the Volkswagen California.

Autonomous driving
According to the chief executive of VW Autonomy, Alex Hitzinger, the ID. Buzz minivan is the basis of Volkswagen's self-driving automobile, and could be used for VW's ride-pooling service branded MOIA, competing with Uber. MOIA launched in April 2019, serving Hamburg, Germany, after a 2018 trial with a small fleet of battery electric Multivan T6 vehicles. The autonomous features are part of the "I.D. Pilot" mode, which is anticipated to become available in 2025.

In 2021, late prototype versions of the production ID. Buzz were fitted with autonomous vehicle hardware and software from Argo AI for testing on public roads in Munich and at the company's private test track near the Munich airport. Previously in 2019, VW had invested US$2.6 billion in Argo as part of a partnership with Ford Motor Company to develop autonomous vehicles. On 26 October 2022, with Argo announcing its closure, VW said it would pursue automation technology with Bosch and Horizon Robotics instead.

Concept versions 

Concept car descriptions in 2017 indicated the electric microbus could be produced in two versions: a high-end  all-wheel-drive version with one motor each on the front and rear axles and an  battery pack, and a less-expensive  rear-wheel-drive version with an  battery pack.

Cargo variant

The I.D. Buzz Cargo (stylized as the ID. BUZZ CARGO) debuted at the 2018 IAA Commercial Vehicles show in Hannover as a support vehicle for the Volkswagen I.D. R Pikes Peak Hillclimb racer.

The Cargo prototype was shown in October 2019 at Nike stores in Santa Monica, California; Chicago; and New York City with retro livery branded "Blue Ribbon Sports", the predecessor company to athletic apparel manufacturer Nike, Inc.

The concept vehicle was first shown as a prototype at the 2017 North American International Auto Show in Detroit, then shown again at Geneva in March. Members of the automotive press were invited to drive the concept during Monterey Car Week later that year, in August, where it was also announced that a production vehicle based on this prototype will be launched.

See also
 Volkswagen ID. series
 Volkswagen Microbus/Bulli concept vehicles

References

External links 

 Official website (US)
 

ID.Buzz
Cars introduced in 2022
Production electric cars
Retro-style automobiles
Rear-wheel-drive vehicles
Minivans
Electric vans
Euro NCAP large MPVs
Electric concept cars
I.D. Buzz